This is a list of mayors organised by country.

Albania

Argentina
 List of mayors and chiefs of government of Buenos Aires
 List of mayors of Lobos
 Mayors of Rosario

Armenia
 Mayor of Yerevan

Australia

 List of mayors and lord mayors of Adelaide
 List of mayors of Albury
 List of mayors of Ballarat
 List of mayors of Bayside
 List of mayors of Bendigo
 List of mayors of Boroondara
 List of mayors and lord mayors of Brisbane
 List of mayors of Cairns
 List of mayors of Collingwood
 List of mayors and lord mayors of Darwin
 List of mayors of Fitzroy
 List of mayors of Fremantle
 List of mayors of Geelong
 List of mayors of Glen Eira
 List of mayors and lord mayors of Hobart
 List of mayors of Launceston
 List of mayors of Malvern
 List of mayors of Manly
 List of mayors and lord mayors of Melbourne
 List of mayors and lord mayors of Perth
 List of mayors of Port Phillip
 List of mayors of Prahran
 List of mayors of Richmond
 List of mayors of Stonnington
 List of mayors of Strathfield
 List of mayors, lord mayors and administrators of Sydney
 List of mayors of Toowoomba
 List of mayors of Wanneroo
 List of mayors of Wyong Shire
 List of mayors of Yarra

Austria
 List of mayors of Linz
 List of mayors of Vienna

Bangladesh
 List of mayors of Dhaka North City Corporation

Belgium
 List of mayors of Antwerp
 List of mayors of Brussels
 List of mayors of Ghent

Bosnia and Herzegovina
 List of mayors of Brčko District
 List of mayors of Sarajevo
 List of mayors of Tuzla

Botswana
 List of mayors of Gaborone

Brazil
 Mayors in Brazil
 List of mayors of Gramado, Rio Grande do Sul
 List of mayors of Porto Alegre
 List of mayors of Rio de Janeiro
 List of mayors of São Paulo

Bulgaria
 List of mayors of Sofia
 List of mayors of Plovdiv
 List of mayors of Varna
 List of mayors of Pleven

Canada
 List of mayors in Canada
 List of the youngest mayors in Canada

 List of mayors of Barrie, Ontario
 List of mayors of Bedford, Nova Scotia
 List of mayors of Brampton, Ontario
 List of mayors of Brantford, Ontario
 List of mayors of Bromont, Quebec
 List of mayors of Burlington, Ontario
 List of mayors of Calgary, Alberta
 List of mayors of Charlottetown, Prince Edward Island
 List of mayors of Dartmouth, Nova Scotia
 List of mayors of Drummondville, Quebec
 List of mayors of East York, Ontario
 List of mayors of Eastview, Ontario
 List of mayors of Edmonton, Alberta
 List of mayors of Etobicoke, Ontario
 List of mayors of Fort Frances, Ontario
 List of mayors of Gatineau, Quebec
 List of mayors of Halifax, Nova Scotia
 List of mayors of the Halifax Regional Municipality
 List of mayors of Hamilton, Ontario
 List of mayors of Houston, British Columbia
 List of mayors of Kingston, Ontario
 List of mayors of Lethbridge, Alberta
 List of mayors of Lévis, Quebec
 List of mayors of London, Ontario
 List of mayors of Longueuil, Quebec
 List of mayors of Markham, Ontario
 List of mayors of Messines, Quebec
 List of mayors of Mississauga, Ontario
 List of mayors of Montreal, Quebec
 List of mayors of Moose Jaw, Saskatchewan
 List of mayors of Newmarket, Ontario
 List of mayors of North Bay, Ontario
 List of mayors of North York, Ontario
 List of mayors of Oakville, Ontario
 List of mayors of Osgoode Township
 List of mayors of Ottawa, Ontario
 List of mayors of Penticton, British Columbia
 List of mayors of Qualicum Beach, British Columbia
 List of mayors of Quebec City, Quebec
 List of mayors of Red Deer, Alberta
 List of mayors of Regina, Saskatchewan
 List of mayors of St. Albert, Alberta
 List of mayors of Saint John, New Brunswick
 List of mayors of St. John's, Newfoundland and Labrador
 List of mayors of Saint-Sauveur, Quebec
 List of mayors of St. Thomas, Ontario
 List of mayors of Saskatoon, Saskatchewan
 List of mayors of Scarborough, Ontario
 List of mayors of Shawinigan, Quebec
 List of mayors of Sherbrooke, Quebec
 List of mayors of Sudbury, Ontario
 List of mayors of Thunder Bay, Ontario
 List of mayors of Timmins, Ontario
 List of mayors of Toronto, Ontario
 List of mayors of Trois-Rivières, Quebec
 List of mayors of Vancouver, British Columbia
 List of mayors of Vanier, Ontario
 List of mayors of Victoria, British Columbia
 List of mayors of Waterloo, Ontario
 List of mayors of Windsor, Ontario
 List of mayors of Winnipeg, Manitoba
 List of mayors of Yellowknife
 List of mayors of York, Ontario

Chile
 List of mayors of La Cisterna
 List of mayors of Las Condes
 List of mayors of Pichilemu

China, People's Republic of
 List of mayors of Beijing
 List of mayors of Shanghai

China, Republic of
 List of mayors of Taipei
 List of mayors of New Taipei(Xinbei)
 List of mayors of Kaohsiung
 List of mayors of Taichung

Colombia
 List of mayors of Bogotá

Croatia
 List of mayors of Split
 List of mayors of Zagreb

Czech Republic
 List of mayors of Brno

Denmark
 List of mayors of Copenhagen

Estonia
 List of mayors of Tallinn
 List of mayors of Tartu

Finland
 Politics of Helsinki#Mayor

France
 List of mayors of Bordeaux
 Brest, France#Mayors of Brest
 List of mayors of Clermont-Ferrand
 List of mayors of Colmar
 List of mayors of Grenoble
 List of mayors of Nantes
 List of mayors of Paris
 List of mayors of Strasbourg

Georgia
 Mayor of Tbilisi

Germany

 List of mayors of Aachen
 List of mayors of Augsburg
 List of mayors of Berlin
 List of mayors of Bonn
 List of mayors of Bremen
 List of mayors of Cologne
 List of mayors of Düsseldorf
 List of mayors of Frankfurt
 List of mayors of Freiburg
 List of mayors of Hamburg
 List of mayors of Hanover
 List of mayors of Leipzig
 List of mayors of Mainz
 List of mayors of Marburg
 List of mayors of Munich
 List of mayors of Nuremberg
 List of mayors of Regensburg

Greece
 List of mayors of Athens
 List of mayors of Kozani
 List of mayors of Thessaloniki

Hungary
 List of mayors of Soltvadkert
 List of mayors of Miskolc

Iceland
 Mayor of Kópavogur
 Mayor of Reykjavík

Indonesia
 List of mayors of Bandung
 List of governors of Jakarta

Iran
 List of mayors of Shiraz
 List of mayors of Tabriz
 List of mayors of Tehran

Ireland
 Lord Mayor of Dublin
 Lord Mayor of Cork
 Mayor of Limerick
 Mayor of Galway
 List of rulers and officers of Galway 1230–1485

Israel
 List of mayors of Jerusalem
 List of mayors of Tel Aviv
 List of mayors of Haifa

Italy
 List of mayors of Florence
 List of mayors of Genoa
 List of mayors of Milan
 List of mayors of Palermo
 List of mayors of Reggio Calabria
 List of mayors of Rome
 List of mayors of Turin
 List of mayors of Venice

Kazakhstan
 Mayor of Almaty#List
 List of Akims Astana City

Kenya
 Mayor of Nairobi

Latvia
 Mayor of Riga

Lithuania
 Vilnius city municipality
 Klaipėda city municipality#Mayors

Luxembourg
 List of mayors of Bertrange
 List of mayors of Betzdorf
 List of mayors of Dudelange
 List of mayors of Esch-sur-Alzette
 List of mayors of Flaxweiler
 List of mayors of Garnich
 List of mayors of Luxembourg City
 List of mayors of Pétange
 List of mayors of Sanem

Madagascar
 Mayor of Antananarivo

Malta
 List of mayors of Malta

Mexico
 Head of Government of the Federal District

Montenegro
 Mayor of Podgorica
 Mayor of Ulcinj

Nepal 
 List of mayors of places in Nepal

Netherlands
 List of mayors of Amsterdam
 List of mayors of The Hague
 List of mayors of Heerlen
 List of mayors of Leeuwarden
 List of mayors of Rotterdam
 List of mayors of Utrecht

New Zealand
 Mayors in New Zealand
 Mayor of Auckland
 Mayor of Christchurch
 Mayor of Dunedin
 Mayor of Hamilton, New Zealand
 Mayor of Taupo
 Mayor of Tauranga
 Mayor of Wanganui
 Mayor of Wellington

Norway
 List of mayors of Bergen
 List of mayors of Oslo
 List of mayors of Stavanger
 List of mayors of Trondheim

Pakistan
 List of mayors of Pakistan
Sindh
 List of mayors of Karachi
 Mayor of Sukkur
 Mayor of Hyderabad
Punjab
 Mayor of Lahore
 Mayor of Faisalabad
 Mayor of Multan
 Mayor of Rawalpindi
Khyber Pakhtunkhwa
 Mayor of Peshawar
Balochistan
 Mayor of Quetta
Federal Territory
 Mayor of Islamabad

Peru
 List of mayors of Lima

Philippines
 List of mayors of Quezon City
 List of mayors of Cagayan de Oro City
 Mayor of Valenzuela
 City of San Fernando, Pampanga#Mayors
 List of mayors of Zamboanga City
 Mayor of Manila

Poland
 List of presidents of Bydgoszcz
 List of mayors of Danzig
 List of mayors of Katowice
 List of mayors of Kraków
 List of mayors of Warsaw

Portugal
 List of mayors of Lisbon

Romania
 List of mayors of Bucharest
 List of mayors of Cluj-Napoca
 List of mayors of Timişoara

Russia
 List of mayors of Moscow
 List of heads of Saint Petersburg government

Serbia
 List of mayors of Belgrade
 List of mayors of Novi Sad
 List of mayors of Kragujevac

Sierra Leone
 List of mayors of Freetown

Slovakia
 Mayor of Bratislava

Slovenia
 List of mayors of Ljubljana

South Africa
 Mayor of Cape Town
 List of mayors of Durban
 Mayor of Johannesburg#List of Mayors

South Korea
 Mayor of Seoul
 Mayor of Busan
 Mayor of Daegu
 Mayor of Incheon
 Mayor of Gwangju
 Mayor of Daejeon
 Mayor of Ulsan
 Mayor of Sejong

Spain
 List of mayors of Barcelona
 Mayor-President of Ceuta
 List of mayors of Girona
 List of mayors of Lleida
 List of mayors of Madrid
 List of mayors of Vigo

Sri Lanka
 Mayor of Colombo

Sweden
 List of mayors of Stockholm

Switzerland 

List of mayors of Aarau
List of mayors of Altstätten
List of mayors of Arbon
List of mayors of Baden
List of presidents of the Executive Council of Basel-Stadt
List of mayors of Bellinzona
List of mayors of Bern
List of mayors of Biel/Bienne
List of mayors of Brig
List of mayors of Brig-Glis
List of mayors of Bulle
List of mayors of Burgdorf
List of mayors of Carouge
List of mayors of Chur
List of Landammann of Davos
List of mayors of Delémont
List of mayors of Frauenfeld
List of mayors of Fribourg
List of mayors of Geneva
List of mayors of Grenchen
List of mayors of Herisau
List of mayors of Köniz
List of mayors of Kreuzlingen
List of mayors of La Chaux-de-Fonds
List of mayors of La Tour-de-Peilz
List of mayors of Lausanne
List of mayors of Le Châtelard
List of mayors of Les Planches
List of mayors of Liestal
List of mayors of Locarno
List of mayors of Lucerne
List of mayors of Lugano
List of mayors of Martigny
List of mayors of Montreux
List of mayors of Morges
List of mayors of Murten
List of mayors of Naters
List of mayors of Neuchâtel
List of mayors of Nyon
List of mayors of Olten
List of mayors of Rapperswil-Jona
List of mayors of Rheinfelden
List of mayors of Schaffhausen
List of mayors of Sierre
List of mayors of Sion
List of mayors of Solothurn
List of mayors of St. Gallen
List of mayors of Thun
List of mayors of Trimbach
List of mayors of Uster
List of mayors of Vevey
List of mayors of Wädenswil
List of mayors of Wil
List of mayors of Winterthur
List of mayors of Yverdon
List of mayors of Zofingen
List of mayors of Zug
List of mayors of Zürich

Taiwan
 List of mayors of Chiayi
 List of mayors of Kaohsiung
 List of mayors of Tainan
 List of mayors of Taipei

Tajikistan 
 Mayor of Dushanbe

Trinidad and Tobago

List of mayors of Port of Spain
List of mayors of San Fernando
List of mayors of Chaguanas
List of mayors of Arima
List of mayors of Point Fortin

Turkey
 List of mayors of Alanya
 List of mayors of Ankara
 List of mayors of Giresun
 List of mayors of Istanbul
 List of mayors of İzmir
 List of mayors of Mersin
 List of mayors of Zile

United Kingdom

 Mayors in the United Kingdom
 Elected mayors in the United Kingdom
 List of lord mayoralties and lord provostships in the United Kingdom
 List of provosts of Aberdeen
 List of mayors of Belfast
 List of mayors of Birmingham
 List of mayors of Bolton
 List of mayors of Cardiff
 Mayor of Colchester
 Mayor of Derry
 List of provosts of Dundee
 List of provosts of Edinburgh
 List of provosts of Glasgow
 Mayor of High Wycombe#Past Mayors
 Mayor of London
 List of heads of London government
 List of lord mayors of London
 List of mayors of Manchester
 List of mayors of Nottingham
 List of mayors of Penzance
 List of provosts of Peterhead
 List of mayors of Sheffield
 List of mayors of Slough
 Mayor of Winchester
 List of mayors of Woking

Ukraine

 Mayor of Kyiv
 List of mayors of Odessa, Ukraine

United States

 List of mayors of Akron, Ohio
 List of mayors of Albany, New York
 List of mayors of Albuquerque, New Mexico
 List of mayors of Aliso Viejo, California
 List of mayors of Allentown, Pennsylvania
 List of mayors of Anaheim, California
 List of mayors of Anchorage, Alaska
 List of mayors of Anderson, Indiana
 List of mayors of Ann Arbor, Michigan
 List of mayors of Annapolis, Maryland
 List of mayors of Atlanta, Georgia
 List of mayors of Atlantic City, New Jersey
 List of mayors of Augusta, Georgia
 List of mayors of Austin, Texas
 List of mayors of Baltimore, Maryland
 List of mayors of Berkeley, California
 List of mayors of Beverly Hills, California
 List of mayors of Billings, Montana
 List of mayors of Birmingham, Alabama
 List of mayors of Bloomington, Minnesota
 List of mayors of Boise, Idaho
 List of mayors of Boston, Massachusetts
 List of mayors of Brockton, Massachusetts
 List of mayors of Brooklyn, New York (1834-98)
 List of mayors of Buffalo, New York
 List of mayors of Cambridge, Massachusetts
 List of mayors of Carrboro, North Carolina
 List of mayors of Chapel Hill, North Carolina
 List of mayors of Charleston, South Carolina
 List of mayors of Charlotte, North Carolina
 List of mayors of Charlottesville, Virginia
 List of mayors of Chattanooga, Tennessee
 List of mayors of Chicago, Illinois
 List of mayors of Cincinnati, Ohio
 List of mayors of Cleveland
 List of mayors of Columbia, South Carolina
 List of mayors of Columbus, Ohio
 List of mayors of Columbus, Georgia
 List of mayors of Compton, California
 List of mayors of Coon Rapids, Minnesota
 List of mayors of Cotati, California
 List of mayors of Cranford, New Jersey
 List of mayors of Cumberland, Maryland
 List of mayors of Dallas, Texas
 List of mayors of Davenport, Iowa
 List of mayors of Dayton, Ohio
 List of mayors of Denver, Colorado
 List of mayors of Detroit, Michigan
 List of mayors of Duluth, Minnesota
 List of mayors of Eagle Mountain, Utah
 List of mayors of El Paso, Texas
 List of mayors of Erie, Pennsylvania
 List of mayors of Fairbanks, Alaska
 List of mayors of Fargo, North Dakota
 List of mayors of Flint, Michigan
 List of mayors of Floral Park, New York
 List of mayors of Fort Lauderdale, Florida
 List of mayors of Fort Wayne, Indiana
 List of mayors of Fort Worth, Texas
 List of mayors of Fresno, California
 List of mayors of Garden City, Georgia
 List of mayors of Grand Forks, North Dakota
 List of mayors of Grand Rapids, Michigan
 List of mayors of Hampton, Virginia
 List of mayors of Harrisburg, Pennsylvania
 List of mayors of Harvard, Illinois
 List of mayors of Highland Park, New Jersey
 List of mayors of Hoboken, New Jersey
 List of mayors of Holyoke, Massachusetts
 List of mayors of Honolulu, Hawaii
 List of mayors of Houston, Texas
 List of mayors of Huntsville, Alabama
 List of mayors of Indianapolis, Indiana
 List of mayors of Jackson, Mississippi
 List of mayors of Jacksonville, Florida
 List of mayors of Jersey City, New Jersey
 List of mayors of Juneau, Alaska
 List of mayors of Kanab, Utah
 List of mayors of Kansas City, Missouri
 List of mayors of Key West, Florida
 List of mayors of Lansing, Michigan
 List of mayors of Largo, Florida
 List of mayors of Las Vegas, Nevada
 List of mayors of Laurel, Maryland
 List of mayors of Lincoln, Nebraska
 List of mayors of Littleton, Colorado
 List of mayors of Long Beach, California
 List of mayors of Longmont, Colorado
 List of mayors of Lorain, Ohio
 List of mayors of Los Angeles, California
 List of mayors of Louisville, Kentucky
 List of mayors of Macon, Georgia
 List of mayors of Manchester, New Hampshire
 List of mayors of Marysville, Washington
 List of mayors of Memphis, Tennessee
 List of mayors of Meridian, Mississippi
 List of mayors of Miami, Florida
 List of mayors of Milwaukee, Wisconsin
 List of mayors of Minneapolis, Minnesota
 List of mayors of Mobile, Alabama
 List of mayors of Montgomery, Alabama
 List of mayors of Nashville, Tennessee
 List of mayors of New Brunswick, New Jersey
 List of mayors of New Castle, Indiana
 List of mayors of New Haven, Connecticut
 List of mayors of New Orleans, Louisiana
 List of mayors of New York City, New York
 List of mayors of Newark, New Jersey
 List of mayors of Newport News, Virginia
 List of mayors of Oakland, California
 List of mayors of Ohio City, Ohio
 List of mayors of Oklahoma City
 List of mayors of Omaha, Nebraska
 List of mayors of Orlando, Florida
 List of mayors of Paducah, Kentucky
 List of mayors of Pasadena, California
 List of mayors of Peachtree City, Georgia
 List of mayors of Pensacola, Florida
 List of mayors of Philadelphia, Pennsylvania
 List of mayors of Phoenix, Arizona
 List of mayors of Pittsburgh, Pennsylvania
 List of mayors of Plano, Texas
 List of mayors of Ponce, Puerto Rico
 List of mayors of Portland, Maine
 List of mayors of Portland, Oregon
 List of mayors of Providence, Rhode Island
 List of mayors of Raleigh, North Carolina
 List of mayors of Richmond, Virginia
 List of mayors of Roanoke, Virginia
 List of mayors of Rochester, Minnesota
 List of mayors of Rochester, New York
 List of mayors of Rock Island, Illinois
 List of mayors of Rockford, Illinois
 List of mayors of Rockville, Maryland
 List of mayors of Rogersville, Tennessee
 List of mayors of Roswell, Georgia
 List of mayors of Sacramento, California
 List of mayors of Saginaw, Michigan
 List of mayors of Saint Louis, Missouri
 List of mayors of Saint Paul, Minnesota
 List of mayors of Salt Lake City, Utah
 List of mayors of San Antonio, Texas
 List of mayors of San Diego, California
 List of mayors of San Diego, California (pre-statehood)
 List of mayors of San Francisco, California
 List of mayors of San Jose, California
 List of mayors of San Juan, Puerto Rico
 List of mayors of Saratoga Springs, New York
 List of mayors of Savannah, Georgia
 List of mayors of Seattle, Washington
 List of mayors of Shreveport, Louisiana
 List of mayors of Spokane, Washington
 List of mayors of Springfield, Illinois
 List of mayors of Springfield, Massachusetts
 List of mayors of Syracuse, New York
 List of mayors of Tampa, Florida
 List of mayors of Toledo, Ohio
 List of mayors of Topeka, Kansas
 List of mayors of Tulsa, Oklahoma
 List of mayors of Vancouver, Washington
 List of mayors of Venice, Illinois
 List of mayors of Virginia Beach, Virginia
 List of mayors of Warner Robins, Georgia
 List of mayors of Washington, D.C.
 List of mayors of Wasilla, Alaska
 List of mayors of Williamsport, Pennsylvania
 List of mayors of Wilmington, Delaware
 List of mayors of Worcester, Massachusetts
 List of mayors of Youngstown, Ohio

Zimbabwe
 Mayor of Harare

References

See also
 List of mayors of Moresnet
 List of mayors of Nablus
 World Mayor
 List of first female mayors
 Special:Allpages/Mayor of

Lists
Lists of political office-holders by country